Igor Alekseevich Novikov, also Igor Alexejewitsch Nowikow, (Russian): Новиков, Игорь Алексеевич (born 2 January 1961 in, Moldavian Soviet Socialist Republic) is a Swiss- Russian painter, art theorist, philosopher, a bbrght representative of sotsarta, member of the Russian Academy  of Arts. Art Igor Novikov belongs to one of the areas of postmodern art, Sots Art. He belongs to the generation of Moscowian Soviet Nonconformist Art painters who have been shaped by the demise of the Soviet Union. Igor Novikov creates his own style of drawing, his philosophy in painting, his own direction – suggestisms.

Life
Igor Novikov was born in a family of a famous artist academician Alexey Novikov (Russian: Новиков Алексей Иванович) member of the Imperial Academy of Arts. He belongs to the generation of Moscowian Soviet Nonconformist Art painters who have been shaped by the demise of the Soviet Union. Art Igor Novikov belongs to one of the areas of postmodern art, Sots Art, which has developed in the USSR within the framework of an alternative culture that opposes state ideology. A parody in Novikov's paintings of official art and images of modern mass culture in general, which is reflected in its ironic title, which combined the concepts of social realism and pop art. Igor Novikov creates his own style of drawing, his philosophy in painting, his own direction – suggestisms . Igor Novikov now lives and works on Zurich, Switzerland.
Igor Novikov grew up in Moscow. He attended the Ilja-Repin primary and secondary school of Fine Arts.
In 1981, he started to study at the Moscow Academy of Fine Arts Vasily Surikov, the central institute for fine arts in the Soviet Union. In 1987 he completed his studies with the Diploma in Painting. Novikov List of Russian artists the term Soviet Nonconformist Art refers to art produced in the former Soviet Union from 1953-1990 (after the death of Joseph Stalin until the advent of Perestroika and Glasnost) outside of the rubric of Socialist Realism. Afterwards he founded with young colleagues the colony of artists "Furmanny Lane" in Moscow within the movement of Russian Soviet Nonconformist Art and was member of the group until the closure in 1991. He is considered one of the most influential figures in Nonconformist Art before and after the fall of the Iron Curtain in Russia. "No! and the Conformists”, State Russian Museum, St.Petersburg, catalogue issued. In 1986 he had a personal exhibition at the “Remont” gallery, Warsaw, Poland. Novikov joined the Union of Soviet Artists 1987, and after the fall of the Iron Curtain in Russia.

His "Red and White” exhibition occurred in 1989 in Hala GWARDIA, Warsaw, Poland; he published a catalogue for it.

Igor Novikov received the opportunity for first exhibitions as a student. After the participating in several group exhibitions in Russia, he was permitted to exhibit abroad.

1990' “Furmanny Lane” was exhibitions at the City Museum Le Manoir de la Ville de Martigny, Switzerland, with catalogue. 1992 Personal exhibition at Villa Turque Le Corbusier, EBEL, La Chaux-de-Fonds, Switzerland, catalogue.

1991's exhibitions "NEW Conformists Exhibitions”, and Anselm Kiefer, Georg Baselitz, Torun, Poland, with catalogue.

Igor A. Novikov Solo retrospective national exhibitions took place 1993 in the Tretyakov Gallery in Moscow (solo exhibition) and 1994 within the comprehensive collective exhibit of the art of Russian nonconformists in the Russian Museum in St. Petersburg. Personal exhibition retrospective the Russia Pavillonat the Russian Chamber of Commerce Seville Expo '92. 1994 Personal exhibition retrospective at the Russian Chamber of Commerce, Moscow. From 1990 to 1993, he worked with a UNESCO scholarship in La Chaux-de-Fonds, Switzerland. Exhibitions "Artistes Russes". 1996 Personal exhibition at the Moscow City Council. Exhibition at the "Russian House" and Francisco Infante-Arana, Eduard Gorokhovsky, Budapescht

1997 Personal exhibition presented by Art Collection Otto, Streletzki, Berlin, catalogue issued. 2002 exhibition Igor Novikov and Alexey Novikov, Valeri Zelinski, Le Manoir de la Ville de Martigny, supported by the Russian Embassy in Switzerland, Switzerland . 2003 Personal exhibition at Design Center, Langenthal, Switzerland, with support of the Russian Embassy in Switzerland.  2005 Personal exhibition at Altstadhalle, Zug, Switzerland.

2008 Exhibition at Chelsea Art Museum, New York, Kolodzei Art Foundation of Russian and Eastern European Art, Kolodzei Art Foundation USA, with catalogue. "Igor Novikov: Goodbye Russia" catalogue for the Solo Exhibition retrospective at Koller Auctions, Zürich. Kunstberatung Zürich AG, 2009.

Exhibitions retrospective  "Igor Novikov: Impression 100/50" catalogue for the Solo Exhibition at Nadja Brykina Gallery AG, Zürich, and Russian Contemporary Arts Foundation,supported by the Russian Embassy in Switzerland Zürich 2010. More work stays in Western countries followed, e.g. in Klagenfurt, Austria, and in Berlin, Germany.

Since 1979, Igor Novikov has participated in over a hundred group exhibitions in museums and galleries around the world, including the first show of nonconformist art. Works by Novikov can be found in the collections of major museums: the State Tretyakov Gallery (Moscow), the Moscow Museum of Modern Art, the Ludwig Museum major public collections in Russia, Europe, and the United States

Since 1990 he lives and works in Bern, Zurich Switzerland.

Works 

Igor Novikov blends in his paintings diverse techniques, styles and time levels. As background he often applies classical paintings from the world heritage of fine arts, in particular master pieces of Russian painters of the 19th century. He replicates these works while alienating them superficially with graphical figures or pictograms. This gives to the paintings surprising and often ironic relationships to real life and current situations. Thus his works become testimonies of the transition of the Soviet Union to modern Russia, but also of Swiss or European issues. This contradiction of well-known classics and modern alienation results in strong messages and effects.

Exhibitions 
2022
Igor Novikov at the Personal exhibition  The Kostroma State Historical, Architectural and Art Museum-Reserve
Igor Novikov Russian Swings personal exhibition gallery of contemporary art "Di Di", St. Petersburg catalogue 
2021
Igor  Novikov at the Personal exhibition The Yaroslavl Art Museum  
Novikov & Новиков at the Personal exhibition The Plyos state historical and Art Museum reserve
Igor Novikov personal exhibition Imperial Tver Travel Palace Tver Regional Art Gallery
2020
Igor  Novikov “EXIT”at the Personal exhibition The Moscow Museum of Modern Art presents its 20th anniversary catalogue
"A man of bones, flesh and blood,"    the Pushkin State Museum of Fine Arts Ivan Tsvetaev Educational Art Museum State University for the Humanities (RSUH) Moscow catalogue
6  Interregional Academic Research Project "Red Gate" , "Against the Current" of the Ministry of Culture of the Russian Federation catalogue 
2019
Igor  Novikov, Tatiana Nzarenko “Metamorphosen” Gallery Moenius Muri Bern catalogue 
Igor Novikov at the Personal exhibition The Tula Museum of Fine Arts
Igor  Novikov, Tatiana Nzarenko, Alexey Novikov Exhibition   exhibition at the Museum of St. Petersburg Art (20th–21st centuries) catalogue
Exhibition “Grotesque”  exhibition at the Museum of St. Petersburg Art (20th–21st centuries)
Igor  Novikov Anniversary exhibition for the 25th anniversary of the gallery. From 15.01 to 28.02.2019 in the Gallery of Nadja Brykina in Moscow
Hermitage Fine Art ( with T. Nazarenko, A. Novikov) Monaco France catalogue 
2018
Personal exhibition at the Personal exhibition , Hermitage Fine Art , Monaco , France  catalogue 
Personal exhibition at the Tatiana Nazarenko  “Time Space “ State Budgetary Institution of Culture of the Voronezh Region “Voronezh Regional Art Museum. I. Kramskoy “Russia
Exhibition “Marx forever”  the State Russian Museum, St. Petersburg catalogue
2017
Personal exhibition at the Shchukin Gallery 4, avenue Matignon 75008 Paris, France with catalogue
Personal exhibition at the Jedlitschka Gallery, Zürich, Switzerland catalogue
2016
Personal exhibition in Plyos State Museum of Landscape of history, architecture and art Russia
2015
Personal exhibition Museum and Exhibition Center Association Moscow
2014
Personal exhibition at the Du Château Gallery, Môtiers, Switzerland
2013
Personal  exhibition at gallery im Schloss Hünigen, Switzerland
2012
Personal retrospective exhibition at the Russian Contemporary Arts Foundation, Zürich
2011
Exhibition and Alexey Novikov gallery Klosbach 45, Zürich
2010	
Personal retrospective exhibition at the Nadya Brykina Gallery, Zurich, with catalogue, supported by the Russian Embassy in Switzerland
Personal exhibition and Alexey Novikov gallery Kunstberatug, Zürich
2009
Personal exhibition retrospective at the Koller Auction,  Zurich, with catalogue
2008
Personal exhibition at Chelsea Art Museum, New York, with catalogue

2007
Personal exhibition gallery Spillgerte, Enetchirel, Switzerland
Exhibition at Europ'Art Art Fair, Geneva, Switzerland, with catalogue
            		
2006
Personal exhibition Gartenflugel Gallery, Ziegelbrucke, Switzerland
Exhibition at Europ'ART Art Fair, Geneva, Switzerland, with catalogue
Personal exhibition at Adler Gallery, Geneva, Gstaad, Switzerland and London, UK

2005
Personal exhibition at Altstadhalle, Zug ,Switzerland
Personal exhibition  at The Centre Dürrenmatt, designed by Mario Botta, Neuchatel Switzerland

2004
Personal exhibition at "O" Gallery, Schaffhausen, Switzerland
Personal exhibition at Franziskanergasse Gallery, Salzburg, Austria

2003
Personal exhibition at the Gallery in Schloss Hünigen, Switzerland
Personal exhibition at Arte Fiz Art Gallery, Zurich, Switzerland
Personal exhibition at Design Center, Langenthal, Switzerland, with support of the Russian Embassy in Switzerland

2002
Personal exhibition at the Du Château Gallery, Môtiers, Switzerland, with support of the Russian Embassy in Switzerland
Personal exhibition at Au Paon Gallery, Avenches, Switzerland
Personal exhibition at the Russian Chamber of Commerce, Moscow, supported by the Russian Embassy in Switzerland and Swiss Embassy in Moscow and the Moscow City Hall
"Artistes russes" exhibition at the City Museum "Le Manoir de la Ville de Martigny" supported by the Russian Embassy in Switzerland, Switzerland, with catalogue

2001
Exhibition at the Gallery of Christine Brügger, Bern, Switzerland
Personal exhibition "Im Höchhus" Gallery, Küsnacht, Switzerland

2000
Personal exhibition at "Im Hof" Gallery, Zug, Switzerland
Exhibition at "O" Gallery, Schaffhausen, Switzerland

1999
Personal exhibition at the Russian Chamber of Commerce, Moscow
Personal exhibition at the Callet Molin gallery, Vevey, Switzerland

1998
Personal exhibition at the "Franziskanergasse Gallery", Salzburg, Austria

1997
Personal exhibition presented by Art Collection Otto, Streletzki, Berlin, catalogue issued

1996
Personal exhibition at the Moscow City Council
Exhibition at the "Russian House" and Francisco Infante-Arana, Eduard Gorokhovsky, Budapescht

1995
Personal exhibition at the “Radisson-Slavyanskaya” Hotel in Moscow

1994
Personal exhibition at Schloss Landskron, Villach, Austria
Personal exhibition at the Russian Chamber of Commerce, Moscow
Personal exhibition at the Bank of Austria, Villach, Austria

1993   	
Personal retrospective exhibition at the Museum "State Tretyakov Gallery", Moscow. Catalogue issued
Personal exhibition at the Russian Foundation of Culture, Moscow
“No! and the Conformists”, State Russian Museum, St. Petersburg, catalogue issued
“No! and the Conformists”, Museum of Warsaw, Poland, catalogue issued
Personal exhibition at Hermagor Rathaus-Museum, Austria
Auction “Perestroika”, “Drouot” Richelieu, Paris, France, catalogue issued

1992   	
Personal exhibition "IL Cavaletto" gallery, Locarno, Switzerland, catalogue issued
Art Expo “Tias”, Tokio. Japan, catalogue has been issued
Personal exhibition at “Au Paon” Gallery, Avanches, Switzerland

1991   	
Exhibitions "New Conformists Exhibitions”, at Anselm Kiefer, Georg Baselitz, Torun, Poland, with catalogue.
Personal exhibition at the "Morgan Manor”, San-Francisco, USA,  with catalogue
Personal exhibition at Villa Turque, EBEL, La Chaux-de-Fonds, Switzerland, catalogue
“Modern Art from Russia” and “Contemporary Masters” exhibitions at the Art Fair, Hong Kong
Personal exhibition at the “La Plume” Gallery, La Chaux-de-Fonds, Switzerland

1990   	
“Furmanny Lane”, exhibition at the City Museum Le Manoir de la Ville de Martigny, Switzerland, with catalogue
Personal exhibition “Soviet Art of Glasnost”, at the “Du Cygne” Gallery, Geneva,  Switzerland
Exhibition at the "InterArt" International Art Fair, Warsaw, Poland, with catalogue
Exhibition at the International Art Fair “Herbst”, Frankfurt, Germany, with catalogue

1989   	
"Red and White” exhibition, Hala GWARDIA, Warsaw, Poland, catalogue published
“Red and White” exhibition, Havenmuseum, Amsterdam, the Netherlands, catalogue published
“Furmanny Lane” exhibition, Museum of Technics in Warsaw,  Poland, catalogue

1988	
Exhibited at the XIV International Art Fair “Perestroyka”, Rome, Italy, with catalogue
Auction of Modern Art "Druout", Richelieu, Paris, France, catalogue issued
             	
1987
“Soviet Avant-Garde” exhibition at the Art Fair, Buenos Aires, Argentine
“Russia’s Youth” exhibition, Helsinki, Finland

1987-90
Exhibitions at Furmanny Pereulok, Moscow, USSR
Interart-87 exhibition at Art Fair, Poznan, Poland

1986
Personal exhibition at the “Remont” gallery, Warsaw, Poland

Collection

Ministry of Culture of Russia,  Moscow
The State Russian Museum, Saint Petersburg
State Tretyakov Gallery,  Moscow
Russia’s Foundation of Culture,  Moscow
State Moscow’s Duma
Museum of Modern Art,  Moscow
The Costakis Collection, Athens
Russia’s Chamber of Commerce
The Russian Academy of Arts
Russian Contemporary Arts Foundation, Zürich
Bank SKA,  Switzerland
Bank UBS,  Switzerland
Kolodzei Collection of Russian and Eastern European Art,  Kolodzei Art Foundation, USA
Bank of Austria
Kunstsammlung Otto, Streletzki,  Berlin
Ludwig’s collection
The State Center of Contemporary Art, Moscow, Russia
Collections Montres EBEL,  Switzerland
Corbusier House,  Switzerland
Adler, Geneva, London
Partiy, A. Mineev, London
FINNAIR
Polish Foundation of Modern Art
Mitsubici
Nekrasow, Moscow
Museum of Modern Art “MARS”,  Moscow
Gorbatchev’s Foundation
EDH,  Switzerland
Collection of Talochkin, Moscow
Collection of Nutovitch,  Moscow
Collection of Vasco de Andreade,  Belgique
Morgan
Collections of City’s Museum:  Moscow,  Germany,  Switzerland,  Austria,  Amsterdam,  France, Finland,  Vienna, USA, Berlin

Gallery

Literature 
 "Red and White". Open Haven Museum, Amsterdam, the Netherlands 1989.
 "Les ateliers de la rue Furmann". Ed. Jean-Pierre Brossard, Editions d'En Haut, Le Manoir de la Ville de Martigny, Martigny, Switzerland 1990, .
 "Confrontation in Fine Arts Toruń 91". Centre of Contemporary Arts Toruń, Toruń, Poland 1991.
 "Igor Novikov". Catalogue for the Solo Exhibition, Editions d'En Haut, from the Series "Jeunes creators", La Chaux-de-Fonds 1992, Switzerland, .
 In: "No – and the Conformists”, Faces of Soviet Art of 50s to 80s. Fundacja Polskiej Sztuki Nowoczesnej, Warszawa 1994. pp. 384–389. .
 "The Tretykov Gallery”. The Master Painters: Igor Novikov. Edition for the Solo Exhibition. Text in English and Russian. Geneva: Studio Editions, 1998. .
 "Artistes Russes". Igor Novikov and Alexey Novikov, Yuri Zubenko, Valeri Zelinski, Le Manoir de la Ville de Martigny, Switzerland 2002.
 "Igor Novikov - Misteries". Catalogue for the Solo Exhibition, Dominik Schoch, Studio Editions Bern, Bern 2008.
 "Igor Novikov: Goodbye Russia”. Catalogue for the Solo Exhibition at Koller Auctions, Zürich. Kunstberatung Zürich AG, 2009.
 "Igor Novikov: Impression 100/50". Catalogue for the Solo Exhibition at Nadja Brykina Gallery AG, Zürich, and Russian Contemporary Arts Foundation, Zürich 2010.
 "Igor Novikov" and many more exhibition Russian Academy of Arts Moscow, Moscow Museum of Modern Art,  Creative Russian contemporary ,Manege Government of Moscow department of culture Catalogues, 2015.
 "Igor Novikov Tatiana Nazarenko Alexey Novikov" Personal exhibition Jedlitschka Gallery, Zürich, Switzerland, Catalogue 2017.
 "Igor Novikov Tatiana Nazarenko"  SHCHUKIN GALLERY 4, avenue Matignon 75008 Paris, France Catalogue 2017.
 "Igor Novikov Tatiana Nazarenko Alexey Novikov" Personal exhibition at the Museum of St. Petersburg Art (20th–21st centuries Russia) Catalogue
 "Igor Novikov Tatiana Nazarenko Metamorphosen" Gallery Moenius Muri Bern (catalogue)

External links 

 Official Website
 "The Russian Academy of Arts: V. Surikov Moscow State Academy Art Institute". http://en.rah.ru/content/en/section-2007-05-07-16-02-20.html
 "Russian Artists in Switzerland”, in Journal of Russian Art, Volume 2010 («Журнал Русское Искусство»), Russian. http://www.rusiskusstvo.ru/news.html?id=475.
 Igor Nowikow at Artprice, the Web Site and Data Base for Fine Arts. http://web.artprice.com/artist/51462/igor-novikov
 "The Risk to be Artist", in Московский Комсомолец no. 25159 от 17 сентября 2009, Russian. http://www.mk.ru/culture/article/2009/09/16/351839-risk-ostatsya-hudozhnikom.html
 "Moskau - New York". Chelsea Art Museum, New York National Centre for Contemporary Arts in Moscow, Kolodzei Art Foundation, «Москва - Нью-Йорк» Парад нонконформистов И.Новикова  2008. http://www.svobodanews.ru/content/transcript/439955.html
 Festival of Russian Culture in Switzerland "Igor Novikov - Impression 100/50", Individual Exhibition. Greeting of the Russian Ambassador in Switzerland Igor Bratchikov at the Nadja Brykina Gallery AG, Zürich.  Вступительное слово Посла России в Швейцарии И.Б.Братчикова к каталогу выставки И.Новикова в Галерее Брыкиной 2010. http://www.switzerland.mid.ru/ru/posolvyst61_ru.html
 Igor Nowikow in the Nadja Brykina Gallery Zürich. https://web.archive.org/web/20140913233455/http://www.brykina.ch/blogs/.
 Igor Novikov internet project dedicated to Russian art market. http://forum.artinvestment.ru/showthread.php?t=160731
 Igor Nowikow and Alexei Nowikow in Russischen Kunstjournal Monolithdigest. German. http://www.monolithdigest.ru/pdf/21/Novikov.pdf

1961 births
Living people
20th-century Russian painters
Russian male painters
21st-century Russian painters
20th-century Russian male artists
21st-century Russian male artists